Staffordshire 1 was a tier 9 English Rugby Union league with teams from Staffordshire taking part.  Promoted teams moved up to Midlands 5 West (North) and relegated teams dropped to Staffordshire 2 until that division was cancelled at the end of the 2003–04 season.  Staffordshire 1 was itself cancelled one year later at the end of the 2004–05 campaign, with the majority of teams transferred into the newly introduced Midlands 6 West (North).

Original teams

When league rugby began in 1987 this division contained the following teams:

Burntwood
Cannock
Linley & Kidsgrove
Rugeley
Trentham
Wednesbury
Wulfrun

Staffordshire 1 honours

Staffordshire 1 (1987–1992)

The original Staffordshire 1 was a tier 8 league with promotion up to Staffordshire/Warwickshire 1 and relegation down to Staffordshire 2.  At the end of the 1991–92 season the merging of all Staffordshire and Warwickshire leagues meant that Staffordshire 1 was discontinued for the years that these leagues were active.

Staffordshire (1996–1999)

Restructuring of the Staffordshire/Warwickshire leagues ahead of the 1996–97 season saw the reintroduction of a single Staffordshire league, which along with its counterpart Warwickshire was a tier 10 league.  Promotion was to Staffordshire/Warwickshire 1 and there was no relegation until the reintroduction of Staffordshire 2 at the end of the 1998–99 season.

Staffordshire 1 (1999–2000)

At the end of the 1998–99 season Staffordshire was split into two divisions, with Staffordshire 1 sitting at level 10 of the league system.  Promotion was to the newly introduced Midlands 4 West (North) while relegation was to the reintroduced Staffordshire 2.

Staffordshire 1 (2000–2005)

The cancellation of Staffordshire/Warwickshire 1 would see Staffordshire 1 become a tier 9 league.  Promotion was to Midlands 4 West (North) and relegation to Staffordshire 2 until that division was cancelled at the end of the 2003–04 season.  At the end of the 2004–05 season Staffordshire 1 was cancelled and all teams transferred to the newly introduced Midlands 5 West (North) and Midlands 6 West (North) divisions.

Number of league titles

Handsworth (3)
Uttoxeter (3)
Cannock (2)
Wednesbury (2)
Burntwood (1)
Eccleshall (1)
Linley & Kidsgrove (1)
Trentham (1)

Notes

See also
Staffordshire 2
Midlands RFU
Staffordshire RU
Warwickshire RFU
English rugby union system
Rugby union in England

References

9
Rugby union in Staffordshire